Skalka (little rock in Czech and Slovak) may refer to:

In the Czech Republic:
 Skalka (Prague Metro), a Prague Metro station of Line A
 Skalka (Hazlov), a village in Karlovy Vary Region
 Skalka (Hodonín District), a village and municipality in Hodonín District in the South Moravian Region
 Skalka (Prostějov District), a village and municipality in Prostějov District in the Olomouc Region
 Skalka u Doks, a village and municipality in Česká Lípa District in the Liberec Region
 Skalka castle (Litoměřice District), a complex of castle tower and chateau in the village Vlastislav near the town Lovosice in the northern Bohemia
 Skalka castle (Rychnov nad Kněžnou District), a castle in the village of Podbřezí, in the Hradec Králové Region

In Slovakia:
 Skalka nad Váhom, a village and municipality in Trenčín District in the Trenčín Region
 Púchov-Skalka, see Púchov culture
 Skalka (hill), a hill in Kremnica Mountains
 Skalka pri Kremnici, a ski resort
 Suchá Hora transmitter, a radio and TV transmitter on the hill

See also
 
 Skála
 Skalice (disambiguation)